R11, R-11, Meaning R11 - Rhyll Anthony, R11.ID

Automobiles 
 BMW R 11, a German motorcycle
 R-11 Refueler a military truck of the United States Air Force
 Renault 11, a French family car

Vessels 
 , a submarine of the Royal Navy
 , a destroyer of the Royal Navy
 , an aircraft carrier of the Indian Navy decommissioned in 1997
 , an aircraft carrier of the Indian Navy commissioned in 2022
 
 , a submarine of the United States Navy

Other uses 
 R11 (New York City Subway car)
 R11 (Rodalies de Catalunya), a regional rail line in Catalonia, Spain
 Caudron R.11, a French biplane fighter
 R11: Highly flammable, a risk phrase
 R-11 regional road (Montenegro)
 R-11 Zemlya, a Soviet tactical ballistic missile
 Oppo R11, a smartphone
 Remington R11 RSASS, an American semi-automatic rifle
 Small nucleolar RNA R11/Z151
 Trichlorofluoromethane, a chlorofluorocarbon used as a refrigerant
 Tumansky R-11, a Soviet turbojet engine
 Umbundu, a Bantu language of Angola